Candamius is an astral god that was worshipped by Celts in Hispania. He is known from inscriptions and place-names in northern Spain.  After the Roman conquest he became syncretised with  Jupiter.

References 

Michael Jordan, Encyclopedia of Gods, Kyle Cathie Limited, 1999.

Basque gods
Stellar gods
Basque mythology